Mikakucha (Kichwa mika wooden plate, kucha lake, Hispanicized names Micacocha, Laguna de La Mica, Laguna La Mica, Laguna de Mica) is a lake in the Napo Province in Ecuador. It is situated in the Antisana Ecological Reserve, southwest of the volcano Antisana.

References

Lakes of Ecuador
Geography of Napo Province